Fernando Tiscareño (born 12 August 1945 in Ciudad Juárez, Chihuahua) is a Mexican former basketball player who competed in the 1968 Summer Olympics.

References

1945 births
Living people
Mexican men's basketball players
1967 FIBA World Championship players
Olympic basketball players of Mexico
Basketball players at the 1968 Summer Olympics
Basketball players at the 1967 Pan American Games
Pan American Games silver medalists for Mexico
Basketball players from Chihuahua
Sportspeople from Ciudad Juárez
Pan American Games medalists in basketball
Medalists at the 1967 Pan American Games